Galium oelandicum (Öland bedstraw or Ölandsmåra) is a species of plants in the  Rubiaceae. It is endemic to the island of Öland in Sweden, in the Baltic Sea. The plant has showy displays of pretty white flowers.

References

External links
Den virtuella floran, Naturhistoriska Riksmuseet (Stockholm)
Hans Bister, Wildflowers and Berries in Sweden, Ölandsmåra (Galium oelandicum)

oelandicum
Flora of Sweden
Öland
Plants described in 1960